Mills' Row is historic building in Cincinnati, Ohio.

Description and history
The large brick building has a rectangular base plan. Located in Lot Number 1 of Joseph Mills' subdivision it is thought he designed and built it. This row house with its mansard roofs and center tower asymmetrically placed is an excellent example of Second Empire architecture in a multi-family building, rare in Cincinnati. The address is 2201–9 Park Avenue. It was listed in the National Register of Historic Places on April 29, 1977.

See also
 Historic preservation
 History of Cincinnati
 National Register of Historic Places listings in eastern Cincinnati

References

External links
 * 

National Register of Historic Places in Cincinnati
Houses in Cincinnati
Houses on the National Register of Historic Places in Ohio